Maupiti Island is a French video game created in 1990 by Lankhor. It is a point and click adventure similar to Mortville Manor, its predecessor. The player assumes the role of a detective attempting to solve a crime by interacting with various characters and collecting clues while further events unveil a complex plot.

Plot
In 1954, Jérôme Lange, the detective already featured in Mortville Manor is on a trip to Japan from Madagascar, when a hurricane forces his boat on anchor in a tiny colonial outpost in the Indian Ocean.

Technical aspects

Like Mortville Manor, the game featured mostly still graphics (by Dominique Sablons) with ambient digitized sounds (by André Bescond), speech synthesis (by Béatrice Langlois) and a point and click interface with numerous menus for actions and movements.

Interaction was achieved through a large list of possible actions, both with objects found on the various scenes, and with characters whom the player had to question. By interacting with the world players would discover clues that would lead them to different locations and other hints. Players could also threatening or bribe NPC so as to learn about their whereabouts, relations with the other inhabitants, or other elements of the story.

Time was simulated, moving around the island or purposely waiting would make it pass. Events as well as the presence of the islanders in various locations occurred according to a timed script. Depending on the player's actions, they could either witness bits of the ongoing plot directly, or question the characters later on about the new turn of events.

Legacy
Sukiya, also by Lankhor was to be a sequel to Maupiti Island and the adventures of Jérôme Lange started in Mortville Manor. The story was to take place in Japan, and was meant to feature a playing interface similar to Maupiti Island's. However, the game was never released due to financial difficulties within the company and low sales of their latest adventure game Black Sect. Sukiya was seemingly in an advanced stage when the decision to interrupt development was made.

See also

Mortville Manor

References

External links
 
Maupiti Island at Atari Mania
Maupiti Island at Lemon Amiga
Maupiti Island Solution on YouTube

1990 video games
Amiga games
Atari ST games
Detective video games
DOS games
Point-and-click adventure games
Single-player video games
Video games developed in France
Video games set in 1954
Video games set on islands
Lankhor games